Bradley Foster is a fictional character.

Brad or Bradley Foster may also refer to:
Brad W. Foster (born 1955), American illustrator, cartoonist, writer and publisher
Brad Foster (musician), guitarist with Abandon Kansas
Brad Foster (boxer) (born 1997), British boxer